Hexahedrites are a structural class of iron meteorite. They are composed almost exclusively of the nickel–iron alloy kamacite and are lower in nickel content than the octahedrites. The nickel concentration in hexahedrites is always below 5.8% and only rarely below 5.3%. 

The name comes from the cubic (i.e. hexahedron) structure of the kamacite crystal.
After etching, hexahedrites do not display a Widmanstätten pattern, but they often do show Neumann lines: parallel lines that cross each other at various angles, and are indicative of impact shock on the parent body. These lines are named after Johann G. Neumann, who discovered them in 1848.

Chemical classification
Concentrations of trace elements (germanium, gallium and iridium) are used to separate the iron meteorites into chemical classes, which correspond to separate asteroid parent bodies. Chemical classes that include hexahedrites are:
 IIAB meteorites (includes also some octahedrites)
 IIG meteorites

See also
 Glossary of meteoritics

References